Cecilio Alonso (born 12 January 1958) is a Spanish handball player. He competed in the men's tournament at the 1984 Summer Olympics.

References

External links

1958 births
Living people
Spanish male handball players
Olympic handball players of Spain
Handball players at the 1984 Summer Olympics